The Azizyans was an Armenian sitcom television series developed by Robert Martirosyan and Van Grigoryan. The series premiered on Armenia Premium on October 31, 2016. However, the series was not available to the public until Armenia TV started airing the sitcom from October 10, 2017. The last episode aired on February 16, 2020. The series takes place in Yerevan, Armenia.

Series overview

Premise 
Hayk Marutyan plays the character of Garnik Azizyan – a clothes store seller, who is the only one working in the family. Mrs. Azizyan is lazy enough to perform the duties of a housewife. The problems of the father of the family don’t bother his 3 children – his daughter, who is internet-addicted and is active in all social networks; his unemployed eldest son, who is a complete loser, and his youngest son, who is a schoolboy.

Cast and characters
 Hayk Marutyan portrays Garnik Azizyan
 Ani Lupe portrays Ruzan Azizyan
 Boris Baghdasarov portrays Azat Azizyan
 Mari Petrosyan portrays Mari Azizyan
 Stepan Hovhannisyan portrays Levon Azizyan
 Ishkhan Gharibyan portrays Alik Rshtuni
 Satenik Hazaryan portrays Irina Rshtuni
 Suren Arustamyan portrays Emil

References

External links
 

Armenian drama television series
Armenian-language television shows
Armenia TV original programming
2010s teen sitcoms
2010s Armenian television series
2016 Armenian television series debuts
2016 Armenian television series endings